Luciana Peverelli (16 February 1902 - 5 August 1986) was an Italian writer, journalist and screenwriter. She was also known under the pen names Greta Granor, Anna Luce and Mariely.

Life and career
Born in Milan, the daughter of a music critic, Peverelli started her career as a playwright, but the commercial failure of her play La donna senza nome prompted her to abandon theatre and focus on literature. After writing some novellas and short stories, starting from her 1932 debut novel Signorine e giovanotti Peverelli successfully specialized in romance novels, characterized by a borgeous setting, non-conformist leads and realistic situations, which later in her career where progressively influenced by feuilleton literature and by its gothic and melodramatic themes. In her prolific career she released over 400 novels.

During her career, Peverelli collaborated with various newspapers including Il Tempo and La Gazzetta del Mezzogiorno, and with numerous women magazines, such as Lei, Amica, Novella and Grand Hotel, and was editor of the children magazine Il Monello and of the film magazine Cinema Illustrazione. In 1947 she wrote the texts of the first fotoromanzo, Menzogne d'amore. In the 1940s and 1950s she also collaborated to the screenplays of several films, starting from Carlo Ludovico Bragaglia's  (1942). She was also a translator.

Pesonal life
An anti-fascist, Peverelli had a long relationship with footballer and resistenza member . She later married and divorced the British lord Philip Ashley Carter.

References

External links
Luciana Peverelli at Treccani
 

1931 births
1986 deaths 
20th-century Italian journalists
Italian novelists 
20th-century Italian women writers
20th-century Italian writers
Writers from Milan